The Town of Pelham (2016 population 17,110) is located in the centre of Niagara Region in Ontario, Canada.

The town's southern boundary is formed by the Welland River, a meandering waterway that flows into the Niagara River. To the west is the township of West Lincoln, to the east the city of Welland and the city of Thorold, and to the north the city of St. Catharines and the town of Lincoln. North Pelham contains the picturesque Short Hills (see attractions). Two important creeks have their headwaters within Pelham; Coyle Creek, which flows south into the Welland River, and Twelve Mile creek, a spring-fed stream that flows north into Lake Ontario.

History
Pelham Township was part of the original Welland County since the late 1780s. The Town of Pelham (est. 1970) derives its name from Pelham Township, which John Graves Simcoe named in the 1790s. In the beginning, the townships were only numbered and not named.  The policy of Simcoe was to adopt township names from England. Pelham was named after the Pelham family though it is uncertain which particular Pelham family member it is attributed to - either Henry Fiennes Pelham-Clinton (nephew to 2 Prime Ministers and considered powerful and influential) or Charles Anderson Pelham (a quiet MP who spoke only once in 26 years in the House of Commons). But in fact, it turns out that it was named after early landowner Joshua Pell's family manor in Westchester County, New York—Pelham Manor—lost by the Loyalist Pells during the American Revolution (Pell went first in exile to Nova Scotia in 1783, before later being granted lands in the Niagara area after a direct appeal to George III.).

In 1922, the Village of Fonthill became a separate municipality by petitioning for land from the Township of Pelham and the Township of Thorold.

Notable people from Pelham
Dorothy Wetherald Rungeling, C.M. spent 106 years in this town.
Steve Bauer grew up in Fenwick winning a silver medal at the 1984 Olympics in cycling and later became a professional cyclist.
World Golf Hall of Fame inductee Marlene Streit also grew up in Pelham, belonged to the Lookout Point Golf and Country Club, and has a park in the Town's core named after her.
CTV's morning show Canada AM's weather and sportsman, Jeff Hutcheson currently lives in Fenwick.
Former NHL enforcer Matt Johnson was raised and lived in Fenwick, although his birthplace is listed as Welland as this is where the local hospital is located.
Natalie Mastracci, Silver Medalist for rowing at the 2012 Olympic Games went to St. Alexander School in Fonthill, Ontario
Lacrosse player Mike Accursi is from Pelham.

Government 
The Town is divided into three wards, each of which elects two councillors to sit on Town Council for a period of four years. The Mayor is elected separately, serves on the Council of the Niagara Region, and (since 2006) also serves four years.

Mayors of the Town of Pelham:

1970-1976: Harold Black

1976-1978: John Weldon

1978-1988: Eric Bergenstein

1988-1994: Marty Collins

1994-2003: Ralph Beamer

2003-2006: Ron Leavens

2006-2018: Dave Augustyn

2018-2022: Marvin Junkin

Additionally, since 2003, a regional councillor is elected to represent Pelham at the Regional Municipality of Niagara.

Regional Councillors of the Town of Pelham:

2003-2018: Brian Baty

2018-2022: Diana Huson

Demographics

Sports and recreation
Pelham's sports include:

 Pelham Panthers

Climate
The city has a warm-summer humid continental climate (Köppen: Dfb), due to the absence of a UHI to heat as in cities of latitudes equal or more to the north as Hamilton or Niagara Falls (in Dfa zone), but approaching this climatic category

Communities

Effingham
Fenwick
Fonthill
North Pelham
Pelham Centre
Pelham Corners
Ridgeville

See also
List of townships in Ontario
Sun Valley Gardens

References

External links

Towns in Ontario
Lower-tier municipalities in Ontario
Municipalities in the Regional Municipality of Niagara